Man in Love  is a 2021 Taiwanese romance drama film directed by Yin Chen-hao, and starring Roy Chiu and Ann Hsu. The film is an official remake of Han Dong-wook's 2014 South Korean film of the same name. The film was launched in Taiwan from March 26 to 28, 2021, and officially released on April 1, 2021. It was available to stream on Netflix on August 20, 2021.

Plot
A debt collector strikes a deal with a debt-ridden woman struggling to care for her ailing father: he will take care of her bills if she agrees to date him.

Cast
 Roy Chiu as Zhang Meng-cheng (Ah Cheng)
 Ann Hsu as Hao Ting
 Tsai Chen-nan as Ah Cheng and Dawei's father
 Tan Qing-pu as Hao Ting's father
 Chung Hsin-ling as Cai Yu'e (Sister Cai)
 Lan Wei-hsu as Zhang Da-wei, Ah Cheng's brother
 Peace Yang as Shu-ling, Dawei's wife
 Lulu Huang Lu Zi Yin as Yaya

Box office
The film was number one in Taiwan for three weeks.

Awards and nominations

References

External links
 
 

2020s Mandarin-language films
Taiwanese-language films
2021 romantic drama films
Taiwanese romantic drama films
Drama film remakes
2021 directorial debut films
Romance film remakes
Mandarin-language Netflix original films
Remakes of South Korean films